Pallapatti is one of three municipalities of Karur district in Tamil Nadu, India. The history of Pallapatti dates back 600 years. Pallapatti is a Muslim-majority town that emphasizes passing traditional and cultural values across generations. There are several mosques, a church and a temple. The Nankanji River flows through Pallapatti.

Climate

The town gets most of its seasonal rainfall from the north-east monsoon winds between late September and mid-November.

Transport

Pallapatti is located between Karur and Dindigul.

There are frequent buses between Karur and Pallapatti, along with direct buses from Chennai to Pallapatti. Connectivity to major cities like Coimbatore, Trichy, Madurai, Salem, Vellore and Nagore is also available from Pallapatti.

The nearest railway stations are Karur and Dindigul. There are five trains from Chennai to Karur. Karur can be reached by Mangalore Mail from Chennai Egmore station and by Palani Express from Chennai Central station. All major trains going towards southern Tamil Nadu from Chennai stop in Dindigul railway station.

The nearest airports are Madurai Airport, Tiruchirappalli International Airport and Coimbatore Airport.

References 

Cities and towns in Karur district